The Black Armada was a name applied to Dutch merchant and military vessels which were prevented from sailing to the newly proclaimed independent Indonesia from Australian ports due to waterfront strikes or 'black bans' by maritime trade unions from 1945 to 1949.

End of World War II
On 15 August 1945, the Empire of Japan announced its surrender, bringing to an end both World War II and the Japanese occupation of the Dutch East Indies. Two days later, on 17 August, Indonesia proclaimed its independence, however the Netherlands refused to recognise the claim and sought to re-assert Dutch control over its former colony.

"Black ban" on Dutch shipping
The ban began on 23 September when Indonesian crew members of four Dutch ships berthed in Sydney held a sit-down strike, refusing to work on Dutch-flagged or chartered vessels, over a pay dispute and claiming that the materiel on the ships was intended to be used to suppress the independence movement. The Indonesian sailors made a request to the Waterside Workers' Federation of Australia to join the boycott, and WWF federal secretary Jim Healy said that the union would not be a party to aiding in the suppression of an elected independent Indonesian government.

The disputes committee of the Trades and Labour Council endorsed the unions' ban, declaring six vessels in Brisbane to be "black". On 25 September 1945, a meeting of some 1400 waterside workers in Brisbane endorsed the black ban on Dutch ships (with no dissenting voice) and declared "that the Dutch Government in Australia shall not interfere with the Government as at present established by the Indonesian people themselves". This boycott by the Waterside Workers Federation speedily extended to bans by other unions: boilermakers, engineers, ironworkers, ship painter and dockers, carpenters, storemen and packers, tally clerks, and tug crews.

The Netherlands East Indies Government-in-Exile responded to this with the use of Dutch troops to load the Van Heutz with the Australian government's permission. In his 1975 book Black Armada, journalist Rupert Lockwood emphasised the unprecedented nature of this intervention:

The Dutch government responded to the boycotts, insisting that any military materiel and personnel on the ships was for the purpose of fighting pro-Japanese militia in Indonesia. Commander Huibert Quispel of the Netherlands Indies Government Information Service stated that the vessels were "mercy ships" carrying food, clothing and medical supplies for the Indonesian people, and that by boycotting them, Australia's militant trade unions were only aiding the Japanese, and the "Quisling Jap-sponsored government" of Indonesia.

In December 1949, after Dutch recognition of Indonesian independence, a conference of 17 trade unions passed a motion raised by Healy to lift the black ban on Dutch shipping, ending the dispute which had run for over four years.

What the boycotts meant
"Indonesian seamen walked off ships,..., refusing to carry troops, munitions, archives, currency and other paraphernalia of colonial rule... Waterside workers ... refused to load Dutch cargoes, tug-crews would not provide tow-ropes, shipyard unions denied repairs to Dutch ships, Royal Netherlands Airforce aircraft and Navy craft.... The boycott extended to Dutch transport, stores and depots ashore." The number of ships subject to the bans included in total 559 craft: corvettes, submarines, troopships, passenger liners, merchant ships, tankers, barges, lighters and surf landing craft, all necessary for the Dutch re-occupation of Indonesia after its declaration of independence on 17 August 1945.

Effect of the boycotts
Lockwood believes that the "schedule-wrecking" delays to Dutch war plans for the newly declared Indonesian Republic gave the fledgling government sufficient time to create the administrative capacity which allowed it to weather the "foreign-promoted carnage and disorder of the 1950s", thus preventing the Indonesian archipelago from becoming another Indochina.

See also
Indonesia Calling, a 1946 documentary film about the dispute
 Dalfram dispute of 1938
 Green Ban

References

External links
Black Armada – 2015 exhibition at the Australian National Maritime Museum

Australia–Indonesia relations
Australia–Netherlands relations
Indonesian National Revolution
Labour disputes in Australia
1945 labor disputes and strikes
1940s in Australia
Maritime strikes
1945 in Australia
1949 labor disputes and strikes
1949 in Australia